In the game of chess, perpetual check is a situation in which one player can  a draw by an unending series of checks. This typically arises when the player who is checking cannot deliver checkmate, and failing to continue the series of checks gives the opponent at least a chance to win.  A draw by perpetual check is no longer one of the rules of chess; however, such a situation will eventually allow a draw claim by either threefold repetition or the fifty-move rule. Players usually agree to a draw long before that, however.

Perpetual check can also occur in other forms of chess, although the rules relating to it might be different. For example, giving perpetual check is not allowed in shogi and xiangqi, where doing so leads to an automatic loss for the giver.

Examples

In this diagram, Black is ahead a rook, a bishop, and a pawn, which would normally be a decisive  advantage. But White, to move, can draw by perpetual check:
 1. Qe8+ Kh7
 2. Qh5+ Kg8
 3. Qe8+ etc.
The same position will soon repeat for the third time and White can claim a draw by threefold repetition; or the players will agree to a draw.

Unzicker versus Averbakh

In the diagram, from Wolfgang Unzicker–Yuri Averbakh, Stockholm Interzonal 1952, Black (on move) would soon be forced to give up one of his rooks for White's c-pawn (to prevent it from promoting or to capture the promoted queen after promotion). He can, however, exploit the weakness of White's  pawn structure with 
1... Rxc7
2. Qxc7 Ng4! 
Threatening 3...Qh2.
3. hxg4 Qf2+
Salvaging a draw by threefold repetition with checks by moving the queen alternatively to f2 and h4.

Hamppe versus Meitner

In a classic game Carl Hamppe–Philipp Meitner, Vienna 1872, following a series of sacrifices Black forced the game to the position in the diagram, where he drew by a perpetual check: 
16... Bb7+!
17. Kb5 
If 17.Kxb7 Kd7 18.Qg4+ Kd6 followed by ...Rhb8#.
17... Ba6+
18. Kc6 
If 18.Ka4, 18...Bc4 and 19...b5#.
18... Bb7+

Leko versus Kramnik

In the game Peter Leko–Vladimir Kramnik, Corus 2008, Black was able to obtain a draw because of perpetual check:
24... Qb4+
25. Ka2 Qa4+
26. Kb2 Qb4+
27. Kc1 Qa3+
28. Kb1 ½–½
If 28.Kd2? Rd8+ 29.Ke2 Qe7+.

Fischer versus Tal

A perpetual check saved a draw for Mikhail Tal in the game Bobby Fischer–Tal, Leipzig 1960, played in the 14th Chess Olympiad, while Tal was World Champion.  In this position Black played 
21... Qg4+ 
and the game was drawn.  (After 22.Kh1, then 22...Qf3+ 23.Kg1 Qg4+ forces perpetual check.)

Mutual perpetual check

A mutual perpetual check is not possible using only the orthodox chess pieces, but it is possible using some fairy chess pieces. In the diagram to the right, the pieces represented as upside-down knights are nightriders: they move any number of knight-moves in a given direction until they are blocked by something along the path (that is, a nightrider is to a knight as a queen is to a king, ignoring the rules on check). There could follow:

1. Ke3+ Kd5+
2. Kd3+ Ke5+
3. Ke3+ Kd5+

and so on. This is in fact a mutual perpetual discovered check.

Noam Elkies devised a mutual discovered perpetual check position that requires only one fairy piece in 1999. The piece represented by an inverted knight here is a camel, a (1,3)-leaper. There could follow:
1. Nb5+ Cc5+
2. Nd4+ Cb2+
3. Nb5+ Cc5+
and so on.

Perpetual pursuit

Related to perpetual check is the perpetual pursuit, which differs in that the continually attacked piece is not the king. The result is similar, in that the opposing side's attack stalls because of the need to respond to the continuous threats.

In the study to the right, White's situation seems hopeless: he is down a piece and cannot stop Black's h-pawn, and his passed a-pawn can easily be stopped by Black's bishop. However, he can save himself by restricting the bishop's movement to set up a perpetual pursuit. He begins:
1. a6 Bxc4
A direct pawn race with 1...h3? fails, as White promotes first and covers the promotion square.
2. e4+!
This pawn sacrifice forces Black to limit his bishop's scope along the long diagonal.
2... Kxe4
Forced, as Black has to play ...Bd5 to stop the pawn.
3. a7 Bd5
4. c4!
Denying another square to the bishop, which must stay on the a8–h1 diagonal. This forces
4... Ba8
And White can then begin the perpetual pursuit:
5. Kb8 Bc6
6. Kc7 Ba8
Black can make no progress.

An example of perpetual pursuit being used in a game occurred in István Bilek–Harry Schüssler, Poutiainen Memorial 1978. Bilek thought he could win the enemy queen with the combination
10. Nf6+ gxf6
11. Bxf7+ Kxf7
12. Qxd8
However, Schüssler replied
12... Nd5! ½–½
and Bilek conceded the draw. His queen is now trapped, and with ...Bb4+ threatening to win it, he has nothing better than 13.0-0 Bg7 14.Qd6 Bf8 15.Qd8 Bg7 with another perpetual pursuit.

History

The Oxford Encyclopedia of Chess Games, Volume 1 (1485–1866) includes all recorded games played up to 1800. The earliest example of perpetual check contained in it is a game played by two unknown players in 1750:

 versus Unknown, 1750 1. e4 e5 2. Nf3 Nc6 3. Bc4 Bc5 4. 0-0 (the rules of castling not yet having been standardized in their current form, White moved his king to h1 and his rook to f1) 4... Nf6 5. Nc3 Ng4 6. d3 0-0 (Black moved his king to h8 and his rook to f8) 7. Ng5 d6 8. h3 h6 9. Nxf7+ Rxf7 10. Bxf7 Qh4 11. Qf3 Nxf2+ 12. Rxf2 Bxf2 13. Nd5 Nd4 14. Ne7 Nxf3 15. Ng6+ Kh7 ½–½ in light of 16.Nf8+ Kh8 17.Ng6+ etc.

The next examples of perpetual check in the book are two games, both ending in perpetual check, played in 1788 between Bowdler and Philidor, with Philidor giving odds of pawn and move.

A draw by perpetual check used to be in the rules of chess.  Howard Staunton gave it as one of six ways to draw a game in The Chess-Player's Handbook. It has since been removed because perpetual check will eventually allow a draw claim by either threefold repetition or the fifty-move rule.  If a player demonstrates intent to perform perpetual check, the players usually agree to a draw.

See also
Desperado
Rules of chess
Stalemate

References

Bibliography

 
 
 
 
 
  (1985 Batsford reprint)

External links
Perpetual Check by Hans Bodlaender, The Chess Variant Pages

Rules of chess
Chess terminology
Chess tactics
he:תיקו (שחמט)#שח נצחי